Thomás Chacón Yona (born 17 August 2000) is a Uruguayan footballer who plays as a midfielder for Swiss club Bellinzona.

Club career
A youth academy product of Danubio, Chacón made his professional debut on 23 November 2017 in a 2–2 draw against El Tanque Sisley. He scored his first goal on 10 March 2019 in a 1–1 draw against River Plate Montevideo.

On 7 August 2019, MLS club Minnesota United announced the signing of Chacón as a Young Designated Player.

On 5 April 2021, Chacón signed on loan with Uruguayan Primera División side Liverpool until 31 December 2021, with Liverpool holding an option to make the deal permanent.

On 26 January 2022, Minnesota opted to buyout Chacón's contract at the club.

On 27 August 2022, Chacón joined Bellinzona in Switzerland.

International career
Chacón is a former Uruguay youth international. He has represented Uruguay at four different age level tournaments including 2019 FIFA U-20 World Cup.

Career statistics

Club

References

2000 births
People from Soriano Department
Living people
Uruguayan footballers
Uruguay youth international footballers
Uruguay under-20 international footballers
Association football midfielders
Danubio F.C. players
Liverpool F.C. (Montevideo) players
Minnesota United FC players
AC Bellinzona players
Uruguayan Primera División players
Designated Players (MLS)
Major League Soccer players
Swiss Challenge League players
Uruguayan expatriate footballers
Expatriate soccer players in the United States
Uruguayan expatriate sportspeople in the United States
Expatriate footballers in Switzerland
Uruguayan expatriate sportspeople in Switzerland